Belçim Bilgin (born 31 January 1983) is a Turkish actress of Kurdish origin.

Life
She was born in Ankara, Turkey on 31 January 1983.  She is the great grand niece of Sheikh Said who is known for the Sheikh Said Rebellion. According to her statement, Sheikh Said is the elder brother of her father's grandfather. Her cousin is actress Rojda Demirer. She graduated in 1999 and studied at Mehmet Emin Resulzade Anatolian High School. In 2002, she started to study at the Information and Document Management Department of Hacettepe University in Ankara, Turkey. In these times, Bilgin, who wanted to be a theater actor since high school years, met famous actor Yılmaz Erdoğan through a friend. She married Yılmaz Erdoğan in August 2006. The couple moved to the United States in 2014, where they settled down in Beverly Hills.

Career
She played the leading role in Iraqi Kurdish director Hiner Saleem's film 'Kilomètre Zéro' and attended the Cannes Film Festival. In 2011 she played in the movie "Kurtuluş Son Durak", Love Likes Coincidences. In 2013 she played in the movie "The Butterfly's Dream" directed by Yılmaz Erdoğan. Belçim Bilgin works with the "Uçan Süpürge", a women's communication and research association, to prevent child marriage.

Filmography 
Babamın Kemanı (2022)
Buluşma Noktası (2021)
Hekimoğlu (2020) - Selin Kurt 
Uzak Ara Eğlence (2020) - Herself (judge)
Room 5 (2020) (short film) - Filiz
Acı Kiraz (2020) - Dr. Panova
Rüzgar (2019) - Ece
Backstabbing for Beginners (2018) – Nashim
Cebimdeki Yabancı (2018)
Çember (2017)
Annemin Yarası (2016) – Nerma
Limanlardan Çağrı (2016) Yvette Kedabdar
Kördüğüm (2016) – Naz
Çalsın Sazlar (2014)
Sadece Sen (2014) – Hazal
Kelebeğin Rüyası (2013) – Suzan Özsoy
Sessiz (2012)
Fasle Kargadan (2012)
Gergedan Mevsimi (2012)
Kurtuluş Son Durak (2011) – Eylem 
Keşanlı Ali Destanı (2011) – Zilha
Aşk Tesadüfleri Sever (2011) – Deniz Usman
Güldünya (2009)
Yol Arkadaşım (2008–2009) – Figen
Güz Sancısı (2008) – Nemika
Dol (2007) – Taman
Hatırla Sevgili (2006) – Defne Gürsoy
Sıfır Kilometre (2005) – Selma

References

External links 

1983 births
Living people
Turkish people of Kurdish descent

Kurdish actresses